Haparanda FF is a football club located in Haparanda.

Background
Haparanda FF currently plays in Swedish football Division 4 Norra Norrland which is the sixth tier of Swedish football. They play their home matches at the Gränsvallen in Haparanda.

The club is affiliated to Norrbottens Fotbollförbund.  Haparanda FF played in the 2006 Svenska Cupen but lost 1–3 (aet) at home to Sävast AIF in the first round. The club won the Midnattsolscupen (Midnight Sun Cup) in 1992 and 1993.

Season to season

* League restructuring in 2006 resulted in a new division being created at Tier 3 and subsequent divisions dropping a level.

Footnotes

External links
 Haparanda FF – Official website
 Haparanda FF on Facebook

Sport in Norrbotten County
Football clubs in Norrbotten County
1975 establishments in Sweden